Ernest I, called "Ernest the Pious" (25 December 1601 – 26 March 1675) was a duke of Saxe-Gotha and Saxe-Altenburg. The duchies were later merged into Saxe-Gotha-Altenburg.

He was the ninth but sixth surviving son of Johann II, Duke of Saxe-Weimar, and Dorothea Maria of Anhalt. His mother was a granddaughter of Christoph, Duke of Württemberg, and great-granddaughter of Ulrich, Duke of Württemberg.

Life
Left an orphan early in life (his father died in 1605 and his mother in 1617), he was brought up in a strict manner, and was gifted and precocious but not physically strong. He soon showed traits of the piety of the time. As ruler, by his character and governmental ability as well as by personal attention to matters of state, he introduced a golden age for his subjects after the ravages of the Thirty Years' War. By wise economy, which did not exclude fitting generosity or display on proper occasions, he freed his land from debt, left at his death a considerable sum in the treasury, and reduced taxation. Public security and an incorruptible and efficient judiciary received much of his attention, and his regulations served as models for other states.

He did not rise far enough above his time to do away with torture, though he restricted it, and in the century of trials for witchcraft he yielded to the common delusion, though he was not otherwise inclined to superstition and was a foe of alchemy. He prohibited dueling and imposed the death penalty for a mortal result.

In 1640, according to the partition treaty with his brothers, Ernst received Gotha.

His laws were not conceived in the spirit of modern ideas about individual liberty; they forbade secret betrothals, tried to regulate dress, and extended even to the stable, kitchen, and cellar. Nevertheless, his regulations promoted agriculture, commerce, learning, and art. His palace of Friedenstein in Gotha was rebuilt, and its collections owe their origin to Ernest; the library became one of the largest in Germany. Churches were built and by his Schulmethodus of 1642 Ernest became the father of the present grammar-school. It was a popular saying that his peasants were better instructed than the townsmen and nobles elsewhere, and at his death, it was said, no one in his land was unable to read and write. He made the gymnasium in Gotha a model school which attracted pupils not only from all German lands, but from Sweden, Russia, Poland, and Hungary. In like manner he fostered the University of Jena, increasing its funds and regulating its studies, with too much emphasis on the religious side. The same fault is attached to his efforts in church affairs, which won him the nickname of "Praying Ernest"; but an excuse is found in the fearful demoralization caused by the war. The Bible was his own everyday book and he strove unceasingly to make his people religious after a strict Lutheran pattern. Religious instruction, consisting in catechetical exercises without Bible history, was kept up even to advanced years and not unnaturally the rigid compulsion in some cases defeated its purpose. Ernest's system has maintained itself surprisingly; it still exists legally though somewhat modified or disregarded.

His efforts for Protestantism were not confined to his own land. He interceded with the emperor for his Austrian co-religionists, and wanted to establish them in Gotha. He became a benefactor to the Evangelical Lutheran Church of the Germans in Moscow and entered into friendly relations with the tsar. He even sent an embassy to introduce Lutheranism into Abyssinia, but this failed to accomplish its purpose. His rule of his family is a miniature of his government of his land; the strictest discipline prevailed at court. Its life was simple and industrious, regulated on all sides by religious exercises. Rules were added to rules. No detail was overlooked which could promote the spiritual and physical development of his children, and their religious education was carried to excess. Nevertheless, his children all turned out well and Ernest died with the name of "father and savior of his people." Oliver Cromwell counted him among the most sagacious of princes; in him was embodied "the idea of the Protestant patriarchal prince and of a Christian governor of State and Church truly caring for both."

Family and children
In Altenburg on 24 October 1636, Ernst married his cousin Elisabeth Sophie of Saxe-Altenburg. As a result of this marriage Saxe-Gotha and Saxe-Altenburg were unified, when the last duke of the line (Elisabeth's cousin) died childless in 1672. Ernst and Elisabeth Sophie had eighteen children:
 Johann Ernest (b. Weimar, 18 September 1638 – d. Weimar, 27 November 1638).
 Elisabeth Dorothea  (b. Coburg, 8 January 1640 – d. Butzbach, 24 August 1709), married on 5 December 1666 to Louis VI, Landgrave of Hesse-Darmstadt.
 Johann Ernest (b. Gotha, 16 May 1641 – d. of smallpox, Gotha, 31 December 1657).
 Christian (b. and d. Gotha, 23 February 1642).
 Sophie (b. Gotha, 21 February 1643 – d. of smallpox, Gotha, 14 December 1657).
 Johanna (b. Gotha, 14 February 1645 – d. [of smallpox?] Gotha, 7 December 1657).
 Frederick I, Duke of Saxe-Gotha-Altenburg (b. Gotha, 15 July 1646 – d. Friedrichswerth, 2 August 1691).
 Albert, Duke of Saxe-Coburg (b. Gotha, 24 May 1648 – d. Coburg, 6 August 1699).
 Bernhard I, Duke of Saxe-Meiningen (b. Gotha, 10 September 1649 – d. Meiningen, 27 April 1706).
 Henry, Duke of Saxe-Römhild (b. Gotha, 19 November 1650 – d. Römhild, 13 May 1710).
 Christian, Duke of Saxe-Eisenberg (b. Gotha, 6 January 1653 – d. Eisenberg, 28 April 1707).
 Dorothea Maria (b. Gotha, 12 February 1654 – d. Gotha, 17 June 1682).
 Ernest, Duke of Saxe-Hildburghausen (b. Gotha, 12 June 1655 – d. Hildburghausen, 17 October 1715).
 Johann Philip (b. Gotha, 1 March 1657 – d. Gotha, 19 May 1657).
 Johann Ernest IV, Duke of Saxe-Coburg-Saalfeld (b. Gotha, 22 August 1658 – d. Saalfeld, 17 February 1729).
 Johanna Elisabeth (b. Gotha, 2 September 1660 – d. Gotha, 18 December 1660).
 Johann Philip (b. Gotha, 16 November 1661 – d. Gotha, 13 March 1662).
 Sophie Elisabeth (b. Gotha, 19 May 1663 – d. Gotha, 23 May 1663).

Their eldest son Frederick was the first to inherit this title. His granddaughter from this son, Anna Sophie of Saxe-Gotha-Altenburg, was a direct matrilineal ancestor of Nicholas II of Russia. His younger son Johann Ernest was father of Franz Josias, Duke of Saxe-Coburg-Saalfeld.

Descendants
See List of members of the House of Saxe-Coburg-Gotha

Legacy
He is portrayed positively as a figure in the fictional 1632 series, also known as the 1632-verse or Ring of Fire series, an alternate history book series, created, primarily co-written, and coordinated by historian Eric Flint.

 Ernestine duchies
 Ernestian Bibles, called

Ancestry

References
 
  Article in the ADB

1601 births
1675 deaths
People from Saxe-Altenburg
People from Saxe-Gotha
House of Wettin
Dukes of Saxe-Gotha
17th-century Lutherans
People from Altenburg
Dukes of Saxe-Altenburg